Billy Frank Parker (born October 16, 1939) is a former professional American football defensive lineman who played in the National Football League (NFL). He played college football at Oklahoma State. Parker was drafted by the Cleveland Browns in the 6th round (79th overall) of the 1961 NFL Draft and by the New York Titans in the 29th round (229th overall) of the 1962 American Football League Draft. He played seven seasons for the NFL's Cleveland Browns (1962–1967), Pittsburgh Steelers (1968), and New York Giants (1969).

References

1939 births
Living people
People from Broken Bow, Oklahoma
Players of American football from Oklahoma
American football defensive linemen
Oklahoma State Cowboys football players
Cleveland Browns players
Pittsburgh Steelers players
New York Giants players